The Candlelight Cafe & Bar, also known as the Candlelight Room, was a blues bar and restaurant located at Southwest 5th and Lincoln in downtown Portland, Oregon, United States.

Description and history

The business operated for 28 years, from 1984 to 2012, and was known for live blues and R&B performances each day of the week.

Candlelight was owned by Joe Shore and later operated by his daughter, Janelle Shore. MAX Orange Line construction caused the venue to be demolished in 2012. The Shores had hoped to relocate the business, which included a record label, to northwest Portland.

The 2018 Waterfront Blues Festival honored the Candlelight, and featured performances by many of its regular musicians.

See also

 List of defunct restaurants of the United States

References

External links

 
  (July 3, 2018), KOIN

1984 establishments in Oregon
2012 disestablishments in Oregon
Blues venues
Buildings and structures demolished in 2012
Defunct music venues in Portland, Oregon
Defunct restaurants in Portland, Oregon
Demolished buildings and structures in Portland, Oregon
Southwest Portland, Oregon